Kynurenine—oxoglutarate transaminase 1 is an enzyme that in humans is encoded by the CCBL1 gene. It is one of the Kynurenine—oxoglutarate transaminases.

This gene encodes a cytosolic enzyme which is responsible for the metabolism of cysteine conjugates of certain halogenated alkenes and alkanes. This metabolism leads to the formation of reactive metabolites which can lead to nephrotoxicity and neurotoxicity.

References

External links

Further reading